The Serbian Vojvodina ( / ) was a short-lived self-proclaimed Serb autonomous province within the Austrian Empire during the Revolutions of 1848, which existed until 1849 when it was transformed into the new (official) Austrian province named Voivodeship of Serbia and Banat of Temeschwar.

Name

History
During the 1848 Revolution, the Hungarians demanded independence from the Austrian Empire. However, they did not recognize the national rights of other nationalities which lived in the Habsburg Kingdom of Hungary at that time. Therefore, the Serbs of Vojvodina took action to separate from the Kingdom of Hungary (which was at that time part of Habsburg Austria).

An assembly was convened in Sremski Karlovci lasting from May 13–15, 1848, where Serb representatives demanded the addition of Vojvodina to Serbia and the restoration of the Serbian Patriarchate of Peć. Serbs declared the constitution of the Serbian Vojvodina (Serbian Duchy) which included the regions of Srem (Syrmia), Bačka (Batschka), Banat, and Baranja (Branau). They also formed a political alliance with the Kingdom of Croatia "based on freedom and perfect equality". They also recognized the Romanian nationality. The metropolitan of Sremski Karlovci, Josif Rajačić, was elected for patriarch, while Stevan Šupljikac for the first duke (voivod). A National committee was formed as the new government of Serbian Vojvodina. Instead of the old feudal regime, a new regime was formed based on the national boards with the Head Serbian National Board presiding.

By 1840 data, Serbs formed relative majority of 49.1% in Vojvodina (compared to absolute majority of 51.1% in 1828). Besides Serbs, these areas were also populated by some other ethnic groups such as Hungarians, Germans, Romanians and Croats. The new Hungarian government responded to the Serb political actions by using force. On June 12, 1848, a war between Serbs and Hungarians began. Austria took the side of the Kingdom of Hungary at first, while Serbs were aided by volunteers from the Principality of Serbia. A consequence of this war was the growth of conservative factions on both sides.

In early 1849, when the Austrian army lost battle to the Hungarian hussars, the feudal and clerical circles of Vojvodina formed an alliance with Austria. Serb troops from Vojvodina then joined the Habsburg army and helped in crushing the revolution in Hungary. With the help of Imperial Russia, the forces of reaction smothered the revolution in the summer of 1849, defeating Hungarian national movement in the Habsburg monarchy.

After the defeat of the Hungarian revolution, by a decision of the Austrian emperor, in November 1849, an Austrian crownland known as Voivodeship of Serbia and Banat of Temeschwar was formed as the successor of Serbian Vojvodina. However, Serbs were not fully satisfied with the new voivodeship, which was more ethnically mixed and included ethnic Romanian eastern parts of Banat, but excluded some areas with Serb majority.

Capitals

The first capital of Serbian Vojvodina was in Sremski Karlovci. It was later moved to Zemun, Veliki Bečkerek (today known as Zrenjanin), and Temišvar (Timișoara).

Flag and coat of arms
The coat of arms of the Serbian Vojvodina was essentially the Austrian Habsburg imperial arms, with the coat of arms of the Serbs (Serbian cross, with four Cyrillic letters "S", on the chest of a black eagle). The bearer of the Serbian arms was the Austrian black eagle, instead of the Serbian white one, in order to show the fidelity of the newly established Voivodship to the Imperial Court in Vienna. The coat of arms was simply added to the Serbian national tricolour. Thus the flag differed from the flag of the Principality of Serbia, which had a different arms in the middle of its state flag.

Rulers
Stevan Šupljikac, the first voivod (duke) of Serbian Vojvodina (1848).
Josif Rajačić, administrator of Serbian Vojvodina (1848-1849).

Gallery

See also
 Vojvodina
 Voivodeship of Serbia and Banat of Temeschwar
 History of Vojvodina
 History of Serbia

References

Further reading

External links

 Map

 
19th century in Serbia
Vojvodina under Habsburg rule
History of Banat
History of Bačka
History of Syrmia
1848 establishments in Europe
1849 disestablishments in Europe